The 2004 Indesit ATP Milan Indoor was a men's tennis tournament played on indoor carpet courts at the PalaLido in Milan, Italy and was part of the International Series of the 2004 ATP Tour. It was the 27th edition of the tournament and took place from 9 February through 15 February 2004. Unseeded Antony Dupuis won the singles title.

Finals

Singles

 Antony Dupuis defeated  Mario Ančić 6–4, 6–7(12–14), 7–6(7–5)
 It was Dupuis' 1st title of the year and the 1st of his career.

Doubles

 Jared Palmer /  Pavel Vízner defeated  Daniele Bracciali /  Giorgio Galimberti 6–4, 6–4
 It was Palmer's 1st title of the year and the 27th of his career. It was Vízner's 1st title of the year and the 6th of his career.

References

External links
 ITF tournament edition details
 Singles draw
 Doubles draw

 
Milan Indoor
Milan Indoor
2004
Tennis tournaments in Italy
Milan Indoor